The Mazda CX-50 is a compact crossover SUV produced by the Japanese automobile manufacturer Mazda since 2022 for the North American and Chinese market. Based on the same transverse, front-wheel-drive platform as the fourth-generation Mazda3 and the CX-30, the vehicle is sold alongside the slightly smaller CX-5 and will be positioned below the larger, rear-wheel-drive based CX-70.

Overview 

The CX-50 was officially revealed on November 15, 2021. Compared to the smaller CX-5, the vehicle is designed with emphasize in "active and outdoor lifestyles", by introducing squarer styling and larger body cladding. A more rugged off-road-styled variant named the Meridian Edition is also available. Mazda's i-Activ all-wheel drive technology and Mazda Intelligent Drive Select (Mi-Drive) are standard in the CX-50.

Compared to the CX-5, Mazda designed a lower roof for the CX-50 to grant easier access to the roof racks, despite the increased ground clearance. It is also the first Mazda ever to feature a panoramic sunroof as an option.

It began production at the Mazda Toyota Manufacturing USA plant in Huntsville, Alabama, United States alongside the unrelated Toyota Corolla Cross on January 26, 2022, marking Mazda's return to production in the United States after 10 years when American assembly of the Mazda6 sedan ceased in 2012. It is also produced in China by Changan Mazda.

In international markets, the CX-50 is also marketed in Colombia since December 2022.

Powertrain 
Additionally, CX-50 will eventually be offered with hybrid options sourced from Toyota.

Trim levels 
The CX-50 in the United States is available in Base, Select, Preferred, Preferred Plus, Premium, and Premium Plus trims. The turbocharged engine option is reserved for Base (Turbo), Premium, and Premium Plus trims. In addition, Mazda also offers a more rugged "Meridian Edition" trim for the turbocharged model, which adds 18-inch wheels with all-terrain tires, side rocker garnish, model-specific front hood graphics, and other outdoor-oriented accessories.

Safety 
The 2023 CX-50 was awarded the "Top Safety Pick +" by the Insurance Institute for Highway Safety. It received overall Good and Superior ratings on all categories except the non-turbo models, which received an Acceptable rating on headlights, as only the turbo models are offered with adaptive headlights.

Sales

References

External links 

  (United States)

CX-50
Cars introduced in 2021
Compact sport utility vehicles
Crossover sport utility vehicles
All-wheel-drive vehicles
Motor vehicles manufactured in the United States